Dehqonobod District is a district of Qashqadaryo Region in Uzbekistan. The capital lies at Karashina. The district consists of 3 urban-type settlements (Karashina, Dehqonobod, Beshbuloq) and 14 rural communities.

Dehqonobod district was established on September 29, 1926. In 1962, Dehqonobod was merged into Gʻuzor district, another district in Qashqadaryo Region, and in 1971 it was separated from Gʻuzor. Dehqonobod District is located in the south-east of Qashqadaryo Region. It is bordered by Gʻuzor District to the north-west, Qamashi District to the north-east, Surxondaryo Region to the south-east, and Turkmenistan to the west.

References

Qashqadaryo Region
Districts of Uzbekistan